Aleksander Vladimirovich Tyuryumin (born 20 March 1980 in Moscow) is a Russian auto racing driver. He had no karting experience in his childhood but at the age of 21 he showed good results in recreational karting and hence he decided to try racing. His racing debut happened in the Russian VW Polo cup. In his first season, he was on the podium 3 times, finished in 4th place overall the championship and first place among the novice racers.

Later he participated in Russian Formula 3, Formula 1600, Formula RUS and the Lada Revolution series, winning the Formula 1600 Russian championship in 2003.

Outside Russia he participated in European Formula Palmer Audi series with 2 second places and 4th overall position in the championship and also was a reserve driver in A1 GP series. He retired from racing after the 2005 season.

Alexander's grandfather, Alexander Mikhailovich Tyuryumin was an aviation test pilot for Ilyushin Design Bureau. He currently also lives in Moscow and holds the title of Hero of the soviet union and more than 10 international world records.

Alexander's last name is misspelled as Truryumin in several web sources.

Racing career

References 

1980 births
Living people
Russian racing drivers
Formula Palmer Audi drivers
Sportspeople from Moscow